Charalampos Siligardakis (born 17 March 1982) is a Greek professional footballer who plays as a midfielder.

Career
Born in Greece, Siligardakis began playing football with Aris Thessaloniki F.C. in the Super League (Alpha Ethniki). In 2001 Siligardakis joined Egaleo F.C. from Aris, and made four Super League appearances for the club. Since then he joined many Football clubs in Greece and Cyprus (Super League and Football league).

On 2 September 2017, Siligardakis joined Diagoras Rodou. He played there for less than two months, before he joined Tamynaikos Aliveriou on 30 October 2017.

After seven months at Panthiraikos, Siligardakis joined Chalkida on 31 January 2019.

Biography

2000-2001	            Aris FC             Super League

2002-2003(1)                Aris FC	        Super League

2002-2003(2)                Egaleo FC	        Super League

2003-2004	            Egaleo FC	        Super League

2005-2006	            AEK FC Larnaca      Cyprus A'

2006-2007	            Nea Salamis FC	Cyprus A'

2007-2008	            Digenis Akritas	Cyprus Β'

2008-2009	            Ethnikos Piraeus	Football League

2009-2010	            Ethnikos Piraeus	Football League

2010-2011	            Ethnikos Piraeus	Football League

2011-2012(1)                Veria FC	        Football League

2011-2012(2)                AEL Kallonis	        Football League

2012-2013(1)                AEL Kallonis	        Super League

References

External links
SILIGARDAKIS OFFICIAL WEB SITE
Player profile Kalloni F.C.
Player profile UEFA
Player Profile EPAE

1982 births
Living people
Greek expatriate footballers
Super League Greece players
Football League (Greece) players
Cypriot First Division players
Aris Thessaloniki F.C. players
Egaleo F.C. players
Ethnikos Piraeus F.C. players
Veria F.C. players
AEK Larnaca FC players
Nea Salamis Famagusta FC players
Digenis Akritas Morphou FC players
Expatriate footballers in Cyprus
Association football midfielders
Panelefsiniakos F.C. players
Footballers from Athens
Greek footballers